There are two species of snake named big ground snake:
 Atractus major
 Atractus arangoi